L'era del cinghiale bianco (Italian: "The Era of the White Boar") is an album by Italian singer-songwriter Franco Battiato. It was released in 1979 by the label EMI Italiana.

This album marks the return of Battiato to pop, after a period in which he substantially produced experimental music (1972–1978). The title song's theme, the "white boar", is inspired by an ancient Celtic myth.

Track listing 
 "L'era del cinghiale bianco" – 4:14
 "Magic Shop" – 4:11
 "Strade dell'Est" – 4:18
 "Luna indiana" – 3:30
 "Il re del mondo" – 4:34
 "Pasqua eti" – 4:25
 "Stranizza d'amuri" – 5:10

Personnel 
Roberto Colombo, Antonio Ballista – keyboards
Tullio De Piscopo – Drums
Alberto Radius – Guitars
Julius Farmer – Bass Guitar
Giusto Pio – Violin
Danilo Lorenzini, Michele Fedrigotti – Piano (in "Luna indiana")

1979 albums
Franco Battiato albums
Italian-language albums